Karamjavan (also Romanized as Karamjavān) is a village in Sarajuy-ye Sharqi Rural District of Saraju District, Maragheh County, East Azerbaijan province, Iran. At the 2006 National Census, its population was 2,262 in 506 households. The following census in 2011 counted 2,425 people in 656 households. The latest census in 2016 showed a population of 2,584 people in 737 households; it was the largest village in its rural district.

References 

Maragheh County

Populated places in East Azerbaijan Province

Populated places in Maragheh County